Abdol Rahman Sarani (also Romanized as ʿAbdol Raḩman Sārānī) is a village in Margan Rural District, in the Central District of Hirmand County, Sistan and Baluchestan Province, Iran. At the 2006 census, its population was 73, in 15 families.

References 

Populated places in Hirmand County